This is a list of American films that are scheduled to be released in 2023.

Box office 
The highest-grossing American films released in 2023, by domestic box office gross revenue, are as follows:

January–March

April–June

July–September

October–December

References

External links
 

Hollywood
2023
American